Pauline Moore (born Pauline Joless Love; June 17, 1914 – December 7, 2001) was an American actress known for her roles in Western and B movies during the 1930s and 1940s.

Early years
Moore was born in Harrisburg, Pennsylvania. After her father died during World War I, her mother remarried in 1925 and Moore took her stepfather's name. She attended Darlington Seminary in West Chester, Pennsylvania, and William Penn High School in Harrisburg.

Career 
The Edna Preston stock theater company gave Moore her first professional acting opportunity. She moved to Hollywood in the early 1930s, and also starred on Broadway and worked as a model. Broadway plays in which she appeared included Dance With Your Gods (1934), Murder at the Vanities (1933), The Prisoner (1927), The Fountain (1925), Man and the Masses (1924), and The Easiest Way (1921).

From the late 1930s through the early 1940s, Moore made 24 films for 20th Century Fox, with whom she was contracted. Her film debut came in Frankenstein (1931).

She later worked for Republic Pictures, starring in four Roy Rogers westerns, as well as the film King of the Texas Rangers in 1940, starring football great Sammy Baugh. Moore starred in three Charlie Chan films, starring alongside Cesar Romero, Allan Lane, and Kane Richmond. She also starred alongside Shirley Temple in the 1937 film Heidi, and alongside Henry Fonda in the 1939 film Young Mr. Lincoln.
 

From her first uncredited role in 1931 through to her last role in 1958, Moore's career spanned a total of 30 films. She made a few television appearances in the 1950s, including a bit part in Spoilers of the Forest in 1957 alongside Rod Cameron and Vera Ralston, but for the most part her acting career had ended, by her own choice.

Personal life 
Moore was married to the cartoonist Jefferson Machamer from 1934 until his death in 1960. They had three children. In 1962, she married Rev. Dodd Watkins, whose death in 1972 left her a widow for the second time.

Death 
On December 7, 2001, Moore died of Lou Gehrig's disease at a nursing home in Sequim, Washington. She was 87.

Filmography

 Frankenstein (1931) - Bridesmaid (uncredited)
 Wagon Wheels (1934) - Young Lady (uncredited)
 Love Is News (1937) - Lois Westcott
 Comic Artist's Home Life (1937, Short) - Mrs. Jefferson Machamer
 Charlie Chan at the Olympics (1937) - Betty Adams
 Born Reckless (1937) - Dorothy Collins
 Wild and Woolly (1937) - Ruth Morris
 Heidi (1937) - Elsa
 Three Blind Mice (1938) - Elizabeth Charters
 Passport Husband (1938) - Mary Jane Clayton
 Five of a Kind (1938) - Elinor Kingsley
 The Arizona Wildcat (1939) - Caroline Reed
 The Three Musketeers (1939) - Lady Constance
 Young Mr. Lincoln (1939) - Ann Rutledge
 Charlie Chan in Reno (1939) - Mary Whitman
 Charlie Chan at Treasure Island (1939) - Eve Cairo
 Days of Jesse James (1939) - Mary Whittaker
 Young Buffalo Bill (1940) - Tonia Regas
 The Carson City Kid (1940) - Joby Madison
 Colorado (1940) - Lylah Sanford
 The Trail Blazers (1940) - Marcia Kelton
 Arkansas Judge (1940) - Margaret Weaver
 Double Cross (1941) - Ellen Bronson
 King of the Texas Rangers (1941, Serial) - Sally Crane
 Studio 57 (1954, TV Series) - Mrs. Boche
 Medic (1955, TV Series) - Ella Sommers
 The Shrike (1955) - Author's Wife (uncredited)
 Cavalcade of America (1955, TV Series) - Esta Cody
 Producers' Showcase (1956 TV series) Wendy
 TV Reader's Digest (1955-1956, TV Series) - Wendy (grown up) / Jane
 Showdown at Abilene (1956) - Wife (uncredited)
 Spoilers of the Forest (1957) - Hysterical Woman (uncredited)
 The Littlest Hobo (1958) - Nurse (final film role)

References

External links
 
 B-Western Ladies, Pauline Moore
 Charlie Chan-Pauline Moore
 

Actresses from Pennsylvania
Deaths from motor neuron disease
Neurological disease deaths in Washington (state)
American film actresses
1914 births
2001 deaths
Actors from Harrisburg, Pennsylvania
20th-century American actresses
20th Century Studios contract players
Western (genre) film actresses